A wheelset is a pair of railroad vehicle wheels mounted rigidly on an axle such that both wheels rotate in unison. Wheelsets are often mounted in a bogie ("truck" in North America) – a pivoted frame assembly holding at least two wheelsets – at each end of the vehicle. Most modern freight cars and passenger cars have bogies each with two wheelsets, but three wheelsets (or more) are used in bogies of freight cars that carry heavy loads, and three-wheelset bogies are under some passenger cars. Four-wheeled goods wagons that were once near-universal in Europe and Great Britain and their colonies have only two wheelsets; in recent decades such vehicles have become less common as trainloads have become heavier.

Conical wheel-tread 
Most train wheels have a conical taper of about 1 in 20 to enable the wheelset to follow curves with less chance of the wheel flanges coming in contact with the rail sides, and to reduce curve resistance. The rails generally slant inwards at 1 in 40, a lesser angle than the wheel cone. Without the conical shape, a wheel would tend to continue in a straight path due to the inertia of the rail vehicle, causing the wheelset to move towards the outer rail on the curve. The cone increases the effective diameter of the wheel as it moves towards the outer rail, and since the wheels are mounted rigidly on the axle, the outer wheels travel slightly farther, causing the wheelsets to more efficiently follow the curve. Abnormal wear at the wheel–rail interface is thus avoided, along with the loud, piercing, very high-pitched squeal which usually results from it – especially evident on curves in tunnels, stations and elevated track, due to flat surfaces slipping and flanges grinding along the rail.  However, if the degree of conicality is inappropriate for the suspension and track, an unpleasant oscillation can occur at high speeds. Recent research is also showing that marginal changes to wheel and rail profiles can improve performance further.

Not all railroads have employed conical-tread wheels. The Bay Area Rapid Transit (BART) system in San Francisco, built with cylindrical wheels and flat-topped rails, started to re-profile the wheels in 2016 with conical treads after years of complaints about the squeal by its passengers. Australia's Queensland Railways used cylindrical wheels and vertical rails until the mid-1980s, when considerably higher train loads made the practice untenable.

Specialised wheelsets 

Some rubber-tyred metros feature special wheelsets with rubber tyres outside of deep-flanged steel wheels, which guide the bogie through standard railroad switches and keep the train from derailing if a tyre deflates. The system was originally conceived by Michelin for the Paris Métro; the first line opened in 1956.

Gallery

See also 

 Axle box
 Beam axle
 Axle exchange
 Drop table
 Flat spot
 Gölsdorf axle
 Interference fit
 International Heavy Haul Association
 Journal box
 List of railroad truck parts
 Luttermöller axle
 Plain bearing
 Rolling-element bearing
 Train wheel
 Variable gauge axles
 Wheelbase
 Wheel gauge

References

Further reading

External links 
 

 
Bogie